The Jack Muller Danie Uys Park is a municipal park situated in Boston, Bellville, Western Cape, South Africa.

Name

It's named after Daniel Uys (b.3 June 1932), Mayor of Bellville, South Africa from 1975 to 1977 and from 1983 to 1985 and Jack Muller a Councillor of Bellville Municipality

History

Formerly, the area was two adjacent, but separate parks. The municipality have set aside the park for its residents. Prof Kristo Pienaar a botanist and prevouis a mayor of Bellville selected the trees and plants for the park.

Management

The Park is managed by the Greater City of Cape Town, namely the City Parks Division and community based organization: "Friends of the Jack Muller Park", Greater Tygerberg Partnership and Boston Spirits.

Activities

It has an outdoor auditorium and indigenous plants and trees. The bird the Cape Weaver (Ploceus Capansis) breeds in the park. It is a free entrance park.

It is open from sunrise to sunset.

The Bellville Parkrun is held here.

Pets are allowed.

Clubs

Bellville Underwater Diving Club.

Bellville Running Club

References

Urban public parks
Parks in Cape Town